According to its organic law, the Attorney General of the Republic of El Salvador is a permanent and independent institution that is part of the Public Ministry, and possesses legal personality and administrative autonomy.

The Attorney General's mission is "to promote and assist with gender equity the defense of the family, the people and interests of minors, the disabled and the elderly, grant legal assistance, preventive psychosocial care and mediation and conciliation services, judicially and extrajudicially represent people, especially those with few economic resources in defense of individual freedom, labor rights, family and real and personal rights." The Attorney General is elected by the Legislative Assembly of the Republic of El Salvador for a period of three years (with the possibility of being re-election).

List of attorneys general

See also 

 Procuraduría General de la República de El Salvador (Attorney General of the Republic of El Salvador)
 Justice ministry
 Politics of El Salvador

References 

Government of El Salvador
Justice ministries
Attorneys general